Pigritia ululae is a moth in the family Blastobasidae. It is found in Costa Rica.

The length of the forewings is 4.5–5 mm. The forewings are greyish brown intermixed with pale greyish-brown scales and greyish-brown scales tipped with pale greyish brown. The hindwings are translucent pale greyish brown.

Etymology
The specific name is derived from Latin ulula (meaning an owl).

References

Moths described in 2013
Blastobasidae